Anathallis obovata, the South American bonnet orchid, is a species of orchid.

References

obovata